Edith Kermit Roosevelt (née Carow; August 6, 1861 – September 30, 1948) was the second wife of President Theodore Roosevelt and the first lady of the United States from 1901 to 1909. She also was the second lady of the United States in 1901. Roosevelt was the first First Lady to employ a full-time, salaried social secretary.  Her tenure resulted in the creation of an official staff and her formal dinners and ceremonial processions served to elevate the position of First Lady.

Early life 
Edith was born on August 6, 1861, in Norwich, Connecticut, to merchant Charles Carow (1825–1883) and Gertrude Elizabeth Tyler (1836–1895). Gertrude's father Daniel Tyler (1799–1882) was a Union general in the American Civil War.

Edith's younger sister was Emily Tyler Carow (1865–1939). Edith also had an older brother, Kermit (February 1860 – August 1860), who died one year before her birth. Kermit, her brother's first name and her middle name, was the surname of a paternal great-uncle, Robert Kermit. During her childhood, Edith was known as "Edie."

The girl grew up in a brownstone on Union Square in New York City. Next door lived Theodore Roosevelt (1858–1919). Edith was best friends with his younger sister Corinne (1861–1933).

Edith, Corinne, Theodore, and Elliott had their earliest schooling together at the Roosevelt family home at 28 East 20th Street. Edith later attended Miss Comstock's finishing school.

Although the two may have had a teenage romance, the relationship faded when Roosevelt went to Harvard University. While at Harvard, he met Alice Lee and they married in 1880.  Edith attended the wedding.

Marriage 
Theodore Roosevelt's first wife, Alice Lee Roosevelt, died on February 14, 1884, aged 22, leaving behind their baby daughter also named Alice. Theodore and Edith rekindled their relationship in 1885.  They married in St George's, Hanover Square, London on December 2, 1886, when he was 28 and she was 25. His best man was Cecil Spring Rice, later the British ambassador to the United States during World War I. Rice also maintained a close friendship with the couple for the rest of his life.
Theodore and Edith's engagement was announced in the New York Times. After their honeymoon, the couple lived at Sagamore Hill on Long Island, New York. Roosevelt called his first daughter “Baby Lee” instead of “Alice” so as not to remind himself of the death of his first wife.

Together, the couple raised Alice (Theodore's daughter from his previous marriage) and their own children: Theodore (1887), Kermit (1889), Ethel (1891), Archibald (1894), and Quentin (1897).

In 1888, Theodore was appointed to the United States Civil Service Commission, where he served until 1895. While Edith supported her husband's decision to accept the position, she lamented that her third pregnancy would detain her at Sagamore Hill.  Kermit Roosevelt was born on October 10, 1889, and Edith moved to Washington with their children three months later. During this period, Edith and Henry Adams became close friends.

At Edith's insistence, Theodore did not run for mayor of New York in 1894, because she preferred their life in Washington, D.C., and his job as a U.S. Civil Service Commissioner.

When Theodore became New York City police commissioner in 1895, they moved to New York City.  In 1897, Theodore was chosen as Assistant Secretary of the Navy and the family moved back to Washington.

In 1898, Edith traveled by train to Tampa, Florida, to send her husband off to fight in the Spanish–American War.

Upon his return from Cuba, Edith defied a quarantine to meet him in Montauk, New York, where she assisted veterans at the hospital. In October 1898, when Roosevelt was nominated for the governorship, she helped answer his mail, but stayed off the campaign trail.

First Lady of New York 
Edith Roosevelt enjoyed being First Lady of New York. During this time, she modernized the governor's mansion, joined a local woman's club, and continued to assist with her husband's correspondence. While First Lady of the state, Edith began a custom that would continue in the White House—she held a bouquet of flowers in each hand. Edith found shaking a stranger's hand overly familiar and preferred to bow her head in greeting.

Edith moved back to Washington when Roosevelt won the vice presidency in 1900.

First Lady 

After President William McKinley’s assassination, Theodore Roosevelt assumed the presidency, and his wife became the nation’s First Lady.

With the country in mourning, the new First Lady could not do any entertaining. Instead, she focused on how to fit her large family into the White House. Edith eliminated the office of the housekeeper, performing the supervisory work herself.

Edith Roosevelt also made a major institutional change when she hired Isabelle "Belle" Hagner as the first social secretary to serve a First Lady. Hagner's initial assignment was to plan Alice Roosevelt's debut in 1902. Soon, Edith began to rely on Hagner and authorized her to release photos of the First Family in hopes of avoiding unauthorized candids.

Edith built on the First Lady's long history of entertaining visitors and made the titular office into that of the nation's hostess. She expanded the number of social events held at the White House, ensured the parties of Cabinet wives would not outshine hers, and worked to make Washington the nation's cultural center. The two most significant social events during Edith's tenure as first lady were the wedding of her stepdaughter and the society debut of her daughter, Ethel.

Edith also organized the wives of the cabinet officers and tried to govern the moral conduct of Washington society through their guest lists.

Edith is believed to have exerted subtle influence over her husband.  They met privately every day from 8 to 9 am. The President's assistant, William Loeb, often helped sway the Chief Executive to Edith Roosevelt's way of thinking.  She read several newspapers per day and forwarded clippings she considered important to her husband.  In a 1933 article in the Boston Transcript, Isabelle Hagner reported that the legislation which created the National Portrait Gallery was passed because of Edith's influence.  Historians believe her most important historical contribution was acting as an informal liaison between Theodore Roosevelt and British diplomat Cecil Spring Rice, a link which gave the President unofficial information about the Russo-Japanese War. As a result of negotiating the treaty which ended that conflict, President Roosevelt won the Nobel Peace Prize in 1906.

The President and his wife became the first president and First Lady to travel abroad while in office when they made a trip to Panama.

A perceptive aide described Edith Roosevelt as "always the gentle, high-bred hostess; smiling often at what went on about her, yet never critical of the ignorant and tolerant always of the little insincerities of political life."

In 1905, Edith purchased Pine Knot, a cabin in rural Virginia, as a refuge for her husband.  At Pine Knot, the Secret Service guarded him without his knowledge.

White House renovation 

In 1902, Edith hired McKim, Mead & White to separate the living quarters from the offices, enlarge and modernize the public rooms, re-do the landscaping, and redecorate the interior.  Congress approved over half a million dollars for the renovation.  The new West Wing housed offices while the East Wing housed the president's family and guests. The plumbing, lighting, and heating were upgraded. Edith placed her office next door to her husband's so they could confer frequently.

Edith took a historical view of the White House and saw that the Green Room, Blue Room, and East Room were redecorated with period antiques. McKim would have removed most of the existing furniture had Edith not intervened.  Edith's intervention ensured that the Victorian furniture seen in the Lincoln Bedroom today was retained.

A larger dining room created a need for more china, so Edith ordered a Wedgwood service with the Great Seal of the United States for 120 people.  Interest in her own china fostered a curiosity about the services of previous First Ladies.  Edith completed the catalog of White House china that Caroline Scott Harrison commenced.  She added to the collection by purchasing missing items from antique shops. When she left the White House, there were pieces from twenty-five administrations.  She created a display of the china on the ground floor of the White House.  The White House china collection that Edith Roosevelt first exhibited is still on view today.

Across from the White House china, Edith displayed portraits of former First Ladies. The once-scattered portraits were a hit with the public and guests to the White House could view the historical china and portraits as they waited to enter receptions.

Edith called on former White House gardener Henry Pfister to help her design a colonial garden on the west side of the White House. A similar garden was eventually placed on the east side of the White House.

The public would first see the renovations to the White House during the 1903 New Year's Day reception.

It was during Edith's tenure as First Lady  that the White House became known as the White House.  Previously, it had been known as the Executive Mansion.

Relationship with her children 

Roosevelt was a devoted mother who spent several hours a day with her children and read to them daily.  She and her husband took an active role in their children's education and often corresponded with their children's teachers.

Roosevelt longed for more children even after the birth of her fifth child, Quentin.  She suffered two miscarriages as First Lady. She had a complicated relationship with her stepdaughter, Alice. In later years, Alice expressed admiration for her stepmother's sense of humor and stated that they had similar literary tastes. In her autobiography Crowded Hours, Alice wrote of Edith, "That I was the child of another marriage was a simple fact and made a situation that had to be coped with, and Mother coped with it with a fairness and charm and intelligence which she has to a greater degree than almost any one else I know."

Views on race 
On October 16, 1901, President Roosevelt invited African-American educator Booker T. Washington to dine with his family at the White House. Several other presidents had invited African-Americans to meetings at the White House, but never to a meal.  News of the dinner between a former slave and the president of the United States became a national sensation. The subject of inflammatory articles and cartoons, it shifted the national conversation around race at the time.  Some Republicans tried to spin the dinner into a lunch. As Deborah Davis explained on NPR, "they got hungry and they ordered a tray, and by the time they were finished, there was barely a sandwich on it. And that seemed to make the meal a little more palatable in the South."  The lunch story persisted for decades, until finally in the 1930s, a journalist from Baltimore's Afro-American newspaper asked Edith Roosevelt if it was lunch or dinner. Edith checked her calendar, and she said it was most definitely dinner.

Among the responses to the dinner was a cartoon created by Maryland Democrats in which Edith sat between her husband and Booker.  The cartoon was widely reprinted.  According to Deborah Davis, this was the first time that a First Lady was lampooned in print.

The dinner secured Washington's position as the leading black figure and spokesman in the United States. Deborah Davis believes that Edith admired Booker T. Washington.  In a March 1901 letter, Theodore Roosevelt wrote to Booker, "Mrs. Roosevelt is as pleased as I am with your book."

According to biographer Lewis Gould, careful reading of Edith's private correspondence reveals racial views that go beyond what he calls the genteel bigotry" of her time.  In 1902 and 1903 "Misses Turner and Miss Leech" performed at the Roosevelt White House.  The women specialized in "Negro Songs" and Lewis Gould argued that by showcasing these performers, Edith entertained "guests with crude melodic stereotypes depicting an oppressed racial minority."

Later life and death 

Edith's last decades included extensive travel to Europe, Asia, Africa, and South America. After leaving the White House, Theodore Roosevelt and Kermit went on a safari while Edith took Ethel, Archie, and Quentin on an extended tour of Europe.

The Smithsonian’s First Lady collection was created soon after the Roosevelts left the White House. When the museum's advocates asked her for a contribution, Edith said that she wasn't sure she could help: she often cut up dresses for the material after she wore them, and her inaugural gown was no exception. Her daughter later donated the remaining bottom half, and the Smithsonian refashioned the bodice using photographs.

Edith did not advocate for her husband's 1912 third-party presidential race but supported him fully when it was underway formally. She tended him after the assassination attempt, consoled him when he lost the election, and accompanied him to Brazil to see him off as he explored the River of Doubt. Both Roosevelts contributed to home-front activities during World War I. For example, Edith Roosevelt was the honorary president of The Needlework Guild of America, one of the oldest nonprofits in the United States which provided new clothes to the poor, from 1917 to 1921.

Edith urged Republican women to vote after the 19th Amendment was passed.

On January 6, 1919, her husband died of a pulmonary embolism in his sleep. He was 60 years old.

During the Great Depression, Edith campaigned briefly for Herbert Hoover to emphasize that the Democratic nominee, Franklin Roosevelt, was not her son. Edith had disliked Eleanor since Eleanor's childhood and animosity had existed between the two women since the 1920s when Eleanor campaigned against Theodore Roosevelt Jr. during his run for governor of New York.

Before her death, Edith destroyed almost all of her correspondence with her husband. However, Edith was a prodigious letter writer and her letters survive in archives such as the Houghton Library.

Edith died at Sagamore Hill on September 30, 1948, at the age of 87. She is buried next to her husband at Youngs Memorial Cemetery in Oyster Bay.

References

Further reading 

 Boera, A. Richard. "The Edith Kermit Roosevelt Diaries". Theodore Roosevelt Association Journal. 12#2 (1986): 2–11.
 
 Forslund, Catherine. "Edith Kermit Carow Roosevelt: The Victorian Modern First Lady". In A Companion to First Ladies (2016): 298–319.

External links 

 
 Edith Roosevelt at C-SPAN's First Ladies: Influence & Image

|-

|-

1861 births
1948 deaths
19th-century American Episcopalians
19th-century American women
20th-century American Episcopalians
20th-century American women
Burials in New York (state)
First ladies and gentlemen of New York (state)
First ladies of the United States
Jonathan Edwards family
New York (state) Republicans
People from Norwich, Connecticut
People from Oyster Bay (town), New York
People from the Flatiron District, Manhattan
Edith
Second ladies of the United States